Southern Living is a lifestyle magazine aimed at readers in the Southern United States featuring recipes, house plans, garden plans, and information about Southern culture and travel. It is published by Birmingham, Alabama–based Southern Progress Corporation, a unit of IAC's Dotdash Meredith.

History
The magazine was started in 1966 by The Progressive Farmer Company, the publisher of Progressive Farmer magazine. In 1980, the company changed its name to Southern Progress Corporation to reflect its increasingly diverse business, and in 1985, it was purchased by Time, Inc. for $498 million. In 2017 Time, Inc. was purchased by the Meredith Corporation, which acquired by IAC four years later.

Cooking
One of the major topics in Southern Living is food, and since 1979, the magazine has published a popular Annual Recipes book each year.

Homes
Southern Living regularly features floorplans, and over the magazine's history, a number of these have become popular home styles in the Southeast. Many of these plans are available for purchase as construction blueprints from the company's website.

Southern Living at Home
In 2001, Southern Progress Corporation started a party-plan direct marketing company called Southern Living at Home. The products available at the parties include exclusive lines of home accessories and dishware seen in or inspired by Southern Living as well the various books and magazines produced by the company.

In April 2010, Southern Living at Home introduced its new name: "Willow House".

See also
List of United States magazines
List of magazines by circulation
Jenna Bush Hager
Morgan Murphy (food critic)

Notes

External links
 Southern Living
 Southern Progress Corporation
 Southern Living at HOME
Voices of Oklahoma interview with Charles Faudree. First person interview conducted on October 8, 2012, with Charles Faudree, interior designer featured in Southern Living.

1966 establishments in Alabama
Lifestyle magazines published in the United States
Monthly magazines published in the United States
Meredith Corporation magazines
Magazines established in 1966
Magazines published in Alabama
Mass media in Birmingham, Alabama
Culture of the Southern United States
Southern Progress Corporation
IAC (company)